

RIM streaming charts 
Below is a list of songs that topped the RIM Charts in 2022 according to the Recording Industry Association of Malaysia.

Starting the week ending 24 March 2022, the Top 20 International and Domestic Singles chart was reconfigured to be exclusively for International single releases, while the Top 10 Domestic Singles chart was reconfigured into a Malay songs chart. Also in the same week, the Top 10 Chinese Singles chart was introduced.

Billboard Malaysia Songs 
Malaysia Songs is a record chart in Malaysia for songs, compiled by Billboard since February 2022. The chart is updated every Tuesday on Billboard's website. The chart was announced on February 14, 2022 as part of Billboard's Hits of the World chart collection, ranking the top 25 songs weekly in more than 40 countries around the globe.

The chart tracks songs' performance from Friday to Thursday. Chart rankings are based on digital downloads from full-service digital music retailers (sales from direct-to-consumer sites such as an individual artist's store are excluded) and online streaming occurring in Malaysia during the tracking period. All data are provided by MRC Data.

Top-five songs 
List of songs that peaked in the top five as of the issue dated 5 November 2022.

Key

References

External links
Recording Industry Association of Malaysia

2022 in Malaysia
Malaysia
2022